Lytham F.C. was an English football club located in Lytham, in Lancashire. The club spent most of its history in the Lancashire Combination, before entering the North West Counties Football League in the 1980s and folding after three seasons. The club reached the First Round of the FA Cup in 1925–26, and the Third Round of the FA Vase twice in the late 1970s.

History

The club entered the Lancashire Combination Division Two in 1904 but only played in the league for one season after finishing bottom. Lytham entered the FA Cup for the first time in 1925–26 and reached the First Round. They were knocked out of the competition 10–1 by Oldham Athletic. They rejoined the Combination in 1929 and played in the league until 1936. After the Second World War, Lytham rejoined the Lancashire Combination Division Two, finishing in the top half of the league in every season through to 1959, gaining promotion to Division One. They were relegated in 1963 to Division Two, which was later renamed Division One, and in 1968, the two leagues were merged. Lytham were again relegated from the combination in 1971, only to rejoin in 1975. In the late 1970s Lytham reached the Third Round of the FA Vase twice. In 1982, the Lancashire Combination amalgamated with the Mid-Cheshire League to form the North West Counties Football League. Lytham were founder members in Division Two. They were relegated to Division Three in 1984, and left the league altogether in 1985.

Records

FA Cup
First Round 1925–26
FA Vase
Third Round 1977–78, 1978–79

Former players
1. Players that have played/managed in the Football League or any foreign equivalent to this level (i.e. fully professional league).
2. Players with full international caps.
3. Players that hold a club record or have captained the club.
 Henry Parkinson

References

Defunct football clubs in England
North West Counties Football League clubs
Sport in the Borough of Fylde
Association football clubs disestablished in 1985
1985 disestablishments in England
Defunct football clubs in Lancashire